Red Jet 1 was a high speed catamaran passenger ferry operated by Red Funnel between Southampton and Cowes on the Isle of Wight. She was built by FB Marine in 1991 and was the first waterjet propelled craft to operate on the route.

Specification
Originally designed to carry 120 passengers, this was increased to 130 in 1993 and to 138 in 1998.

History
After undergoing trials she was christened by Lady Stuart on 15 February 1991, subsequently entering service on 6 April. Her introduction led to the withdrawal of the hydrofoil ferry Shearwater 3.

Between August and September 2008, she was chartered by the Stagecoach Group to operate a trial service in Torbay. By this time she was operating as the reserve boat covering off-peak services and overhauls.

In 2009, she was withdrawn from service and, along with her sister craft, Red Jet 2, sold to Caspian Mainport for service in the Black Sea. The two craft left Southampton on the La Rochelle bound for Saint Petersburg on 14 May. She was renamed CM Jet 1 and used on Caspian's ferry routes. in 2018 she was repurposed for use as an offshore supply ship and renamed SA Jet 1.

See also
Red Jet 2
Red Jet 3
Red Jet 4
Red Jet 5
Red Jet 6
Red Jet 7

References

Ferries of England
Ferry transport on the Isle of Wight
1991 ships
Individual catamarans
Ships of Red Funnel